Henry Mitchell (c.1320-1384) was an Irish judge of the fourteenth century. He is one of the first recorded holders of the office of Attorney General for Ireland and was subsequently Chief Baron of the Irish Exchequer and Chief Justice of the Irish Common Pleas.

He was born at Killeek, County Dublin, son of John Mitchell. He is recorded as living in England in 1344: he was probably studying law there, as Ireland then had no law school. From 1372 to  1376 he was Attorney General for Ireland, with a salary of £1 and 1 shilling, and authority to practice in the Court of Exchequer (Ireland) and the Court of Common Pleas (Ireland), a common limitation at the time. In 1372 he and Roger Hawkenshaw, the Escheator of Ireland, appeared as expert witnesses at a lawsuit in Kilkenny before the Court of King's Bench (Ireland), where Philip Overy claimed possession of certain lands allegedly left to him by Thomas le Botiller.

He sat in the Irish House of Commons in the Parliament of 1375. In the same year he and John FitzRery, the new Escheator of Ireland, were ordered to collect the King's debts. He held office briefly as an ordinary Baron of the Exchequer, and as Chief Baron of the Irish Exchequer in 1376-7 and was then transferred to the Court of Common Pleas (Ireland) as its Chief Justice. His predecessor Robert Preston, 1st Baron Gormanston, was removed from office at his own request, "unless the King or Privy Council of Ireland  should order otherwise". Preston apparently retired due to advancing age, and was ordered to deliver to his successor all records relating to the office. Mitchell died in 1384.

References

People from County Dublin
1384 deaths
Attorneys-General for Ireland
Year of birth uncertain
Members of the Parliament of Ireland (pre-1801)
Chief Barons of the Irish Exchequer
Chief Justices of the Irish Common Pleas